Abdul Kizmaz (born 10 May 1992) is a German footballer who plays as a midfielder for SV Preußen Merchweiler. He came through 1. FC Saarbrücken's youth setup, and made his first-team debut in October 2010, when he replaced Nico Zimmermann in a 3rd Liga match against VfR Aalen. He was released by Saarbrücken in 2012 and signed for Borussia Neunkirchen.

References

External links

1992 births
Living people
German people of Turkish descent
1. FC Saarbrücken players
3. Liga players
Association football midfielders
Borussia Neunkirchen players
German footballers
Sportspeople from Neunkirchen, Saarland